A wind turbine is a device that converts the kinetic energy of wind into electrical energy. As of 2020, hundreds of thousands of large turbines, in installations known as wind farms, were generating over 650 gigawatts of power, with 60 GW added each year. Wind turbines are an increasingly important source of intermittent renewable energy, and are used in many countries to lower energy costs and reduce reliance on fossil fuels. One study claimed that,  wind had the "lowest relative greenhouse gas emissions, the least water consumption demands and the most favorable social impacts" compared to photovoltaic, hydro, geothermal, coal and gas energy sources.

Smaller wind turbines are used for applications such as battery charging for auxiliary power for boats or caravans, and to power traffic warning signs. Larger turbines can contribute to a domestic power supply while selling unused power back to the utility supplier via the electrical grid.

Wind turbines are manufactured in a wide range of sizes, with either horizontal or vertical axes.

History 

The windwheel of Hero of Alexandria (10 AD – 70 CE) marks one of the first recorded instances of wind powering a machine. However, the first known practical wind power plants were built in Sistan, an Eastern province of Persia (now Iran), from the 7th century. These "Panemone" were vertical axle windmills, which had long vertical drive shafts with rectangular blades. Made of six to twelve sails covered in reed matting or cloth material, these windmills were used to grind grain or draw up water, and were used in the gristmilling and sugarcane industries.

Wind power first appeared in Europe during the Middle Ages. The first historical records of their use in England date to the 11th and 12th centuries; there are reports of German crusaders taking their windmill-making skills to Syria around 1190. By the 14th century, Dutch windmills were in use to drain areas of the Rhine delta. Advanced wind turbines were described by Croatian inventor Fausto Veranzio in his book "Machinae Novae" (1595), he described vertical axis wind turbines with curved or V-shaped blades.

The first electricity-generating wind turbine was a battery-charging machine installed in July 1887 by Scottish academic James Blyth to light his holiday home in Marykirk, Scotland. Some months later, American inventor Charles F. Brush was able to build the first automatically operated wind turbine after consulting local University professors and his colleagues Jacob S. Gibbs and Brinsley Coleberd and successfully getting the blueprints peer-reviewed for electricity production. Although Blyth's turbine was considered uneconomical in the United Kingdom, electricity generation by wind turbines was more cost effective in countries with widely scattered populations.

In Denmark by 1900, there were about 2500 windmills for mechanical loads such as pumps and mills, producing an estimated combined peak power of about 30 megawatts (MW). The largest machines were on  towers with four-bladed  diameter rotors. By 1908, there were 72 wind-driven electric generators operating in the United States from 5 kilowatts (kW) to 25 kW. Around the time of World War I, American windmill makers were producing 100,000 farm windmills each year, mostly for water-pumping.

By the 1930s, wind generators for electricity were common on farms, mostly in the United States where distribution systems had not yet been installed.

A forerunner of modern horizontal-axis wind generators was in service at Yalta, USSR in 1931. This was a 100 kW generator on a  tower, connected to the local 6.3 kV distribution system. It was reported to have an annual capacity factor of 32 percent, not much different from current wind machines.

In the autumn of 1941, the first megawatt-class wind turbine was synchronized to a utility grid in Vermont. The Smith–Putnam wind turbine only ran for 1,100 hours before suffering a critical failure. The unit was not repaired, because of a shortage of materials during the war.

The first utility grid-connected wind turbine to operate in the UK was built by John Brown & Company in 1951 in the Orkney Islands.

Despite these diverse developments, developments in fossil fuel systems almost eliminated any wind turbine systems larger than supermicro size. In the early 1970s, however, anti-nuclear protests in Denmark spurred artisan mechanics to develop microturbines of 22 kW. Organizing owners into associations and co-operatives led to the lobbying of the government and utilities and provided incentives for larger turbines throughout the 1980s and later. Local activists in Germany, nascent turbine manufacturers in Spain, and large investors in the United States in the early 1990s then lobbied for policies that stimulated the industry in those countries.

It has been argued that expanding the use of wind power will lead to increasing geopolitical competition over critical materials for wind turbines, such as rare earth elements neodymium, praseodymium, and dysprosium. However, this perspective has been critically dismissed for failing to relay how most wind turbines do not use permanent magnets and for underestimating the power of economic incentives for the expanded production of these minerals.

References

Wind Power Density (WPD) is a quantitative measure of wind energy available at any location. It is the mean annual power available per square meter of swept area of a turbine, and is calculated for different heights above ground. Calculation of wind power density includes the effect of wind velocity and air density.

Wind turbines are classified by the wind speed they are designed for, from class I to class III, with A to C referring to the turbulence intensity of the wind.

Efficiency 
Conservation of mass requires that the amount of air entering and exiting a turbine must be equal. Accordingly, Betz's law gives the maximal achievable extraction of wind power by a wind turbine as  (59.3%) of the rate at which the kinetic energy of the air arrives at the turbine.

The maximum theoretical power output of a wind machine is thus  times the rate at which kinetic energy of the air arrives at the effective disk area of the machine. If the effective area of the disk is A, and the wind velocity v, the maximum theoretical power output P is:

,

where ρ is the air density.

Wind-to-rotor efficiency (including rotor blade friction and drag) are among the factors affecting the final price of wind power.
Further inefficiencies, such as gearbox losses, generator and converter losses, reduce the power delivered by a wind turbine. To protect components from undue wear, extracted power is held constant above the rated operating speed as theoretical power increases at the cube of wind speed, further reducing theoretical efficiency. In 2001, commercial utility-connected turbines delivered 75% to 80% of the Betz limit of power extractable from the wind, at rated operating speed.

Efficiency can decrease slightly over time, one of the main reasons being dust and insect carcasses on the blades, which alter the aerodynamic profile and essentially reduce the lift to drag ratio of the airfoil. Analysis of 3128 wind turbines older than 10 years in Denmark showed that half of the turbines had no decrease, while the other half saw a production decrease of 1.2% per year.

In general, more stable and constant weather conditions (most notably wind speed) result in an average of 15% greater efficiency than that of a wind turbine in unstable weather conditions, thus allowing up to a 7% increase in wind speed under stable conditions. This is due to a faster recovery wake and greater flow entrainment that occur in conditions of higher atmospheric stability. However, wind turbine wakes have been found to recover faster under unstable atmospheric conditions as opposed to a stable environment.

Different materials have varying effects on the efficiency of wind turbines. In an Ege University experiment, three wind turbines, each with three blades with a diameter of one meter, were constructed with blades made of different materials: A glass and glass/carbon epoxy, glass/carbon, and glass/polyester. When tested, the results showed that the materials with higher overall masses had a greater friction moment and thus a lower power coefficient.

The air velocity is the major contributor to the turbine efficiency. This is the reason for the importance of choosing the right location. The wind velocity will be high near the shore because of the temperature difference between the land and the ocean. Another option is to place turbines on mountain ridges. The higher the wind turbine will be, the higher the wind velocity on average. A windbreak can also increase the wind velocity near the turbine.

Types 

Wind turbines can rotate about either a horizontal or a vertical axis, the former being both older and more common. They can also include blades or be bladeless. Household-size vertical designs produce less power and are less common.

Horizontal axis 

Large three-bladed horizontal-axis wind turbines (HAWT) with the blades upwind of the tower produce the overwhelming majority of wind power in the world today. These turbines have the main rotor shaft and electrical generator at the top of a tower, and must be pointed into the wind. Small turbines are pointed by a simple wind vane, while large turbines generally use a wind sensor coupled with a yaw system. Most have a gearbox, which turns the slow rotation of the blades into a quicker rotation that is more suitable to drive an electrical generator. Some turbines use a different type of generator suited to slower rotational speed input. These don't need a gearbox and are called direct-drive, meaning they couple the rotor directly to the generator with no gearbox in between. While permanent magnet direct-drive generators can be more costly due to the rare earth materials required, these gearless turbines are sometimes preferred over gearbox generators because they "eliminate the gear-speed increaser, which is susceptible to significant accumulated fatigue torque loading, related reliability issues, and maintenance costs." There is also the pseudo direct drive mechanism, which has some advantages over the permanent magnet direct drive mechanism.

Most horizontal axis turbines have their rotors upwind of the supporting tower. Downwind machines have been built, because they don't need an additional mechanism for keeping them in line with the wind. In high winds, the blades can also be allowed to bend, which reduces their swept area and thus their wind resistance. Despite these advantages, upwind designs are preferred, because the change in loading from the wind as each blade passes behind the supporting tower can cause damage to the turbine.

Turbines used in wind farms for commercial production of electric power are usually three-bladed. These have low torque ripple, which contributes to good reliability. The size and height of turbines increase year by year. Designs with 10 to 12 MW were in preparation in 2018, and a "15 MW+" prototype with three  blades is planned to be constructed in 2022. Usual multi megawatt turbines have tubular steel towers with a height of 70m to 120m and in extremes up to 160m.

Vertical axis 
Vertical-axis wind turbines (or VAWTs) have the main rotor shaft arranged vertically. One advantage of this arrangement is that the turbine does not need to be pointed into the wind to be effective, which is an advantage on a site where the wind direction is highly variable. It is also an advantage when the turbine is integrated into a building because it is inherently less steerable. Also, the generator and gearbox can be placed near the ground, using a direct drive from the rotor assembly to the ground-based gearbox, improving accessibility for maintenance. However, these designs produce much less energy averaged over time, which is a major drawback.

Vertical turbine designs have much lower efficiency than standard horizontal designs. The key disadvantages include the relatively low rotational speed with the consequential higher torque and hence higher cost of the drive train, the inherently lower power coefficient, the 360-degree rotation of the aerofoil within the wind flow during each cycle and hence the highly dynamic loading on the blade, the pulsating torque generated by some rotor designs on the drive train, and the difficulty of modelling the wind flow accurately and hence the challenges of analysing and designing the rotor prior to fabricating a prototype.

When a turbine is mounted on a rooftop the building generally redirects wind over the roof and this can double the wind speed at the turbine. If the height of a rooftop mounted turbine tower is approximately 50% of the building height it is near the optimum for maximum wind energy and minimum wind turbulence. While wind speeds within the built environment are generally much lower than at exposed rural sites, noise may be a concern and an existing structure may not adequately resist the additional stress.

Subtypes of the vertical axis design include:

Darrieus wind turbine

"Eggbeater" turbines, or Darrieus turbines, were named after the French inventor, Georges Darrieus. They have good efficiency, but produce large torque ripple and cyclical stress on the tower, which contributes to poor reliability. They also generally require some external power source, or an additional Savonius rotor to start turning, because the starting torque is very low. The torque ripple is reduced by using three or more blades, which results in greater solidity of the rotor. Solidity is measured by blade area divided by the rotor area. Newer Darrieus type turbines are not held up by guy-wires but have an external superstructure connected to the top bearing.

Giromill
A subtype of Darrieus turbine with straight, as opposed to curved, blades. The cycloturbine variety has variable pitch to reduce the torque pulsation and is self-starting. The advantages of variable pitch are: high starting torque; a wide, relatively flat torque curve; a higher coefficient of performance; more efficient operation in turbulent winds; and a lower blade speed ratio which lowers blade bending stresses. Straight, V, or curved blades may be used.

Savonius wind turbine

These are drag-type devices with two (or more) scoops that are used in anemometers, Flettner vents (commonly seen on bus and van roofs), and in some high-reliability low-efficiency power turbines. They are always self-starting if there are at least three scoops.

Twisted Savonius is a modified savonius, with long helical scoops to provide smooth torque. This is often used as a rooftop wind turbine and has even been adapted for ships.

Parallel
The parallel turbine is similar to the crossflow fan or centrifugal fan. It uses the ground effect. Vertical axis turbines of this type have been tried for many years: a unit producing 10 kW was built by Israeli wind pioneer Bruce Brill in the 1980s.

Unconventional types

Design and construction 

Wind turbine design is a careful balance of cost, energy output, and fatigue life.

Components
Wind turbines convert wind energy to electrical energy for distribution. Conventional horizontal axis turbines can be divided into three components:

 The rotor, which is approximately 20% of the wind turbine cost, includes the blades for converting wind energy to low speed rotational energy.
 The generator, which is approximately 34% of the wind turbine cost, includes the electrical generator, the control electronics, and most likely a gearbox (e.g., planetary gear box), adjustable-speed drive, or continuously variable transmission component for converting the low-speed incoming rotation to high-speed rotation suitable for generating electricity.
 The surrounding structure, which is approximately 15% of the wind turbine cost, includes the tower and rotor yaw mechanism.

The rotor assembly (blades and hub) weighs . The nacelle, which contains the generator, weighs . The concrete base for the tower is constructed using  reinforcing steel and contains  of concrete.

Turbine monitoring and diagnostics 

Due to data transmission problems, structural health monitoring of wind turbines is usually performed using several accelerometers and strain gages attached to the nacelle to monitor the gearbox and equipment. Currently, digital image correlation and stereophotogrammetry are used to measure dynamics of wind turbine blades. These methods usually measure displacement and strain to identify location of defects. Dynamic characteristics of non-rotating wind turbines have been measured using digital image correlation and photogrammetry. Three dimensional point tracking has also been used to measure rotating dynamics of wind turbines.

Technology 

Generally, efficiency increases along with turbine blade lengths. The blades must be stiff, strong, durable, light and resistant to fatigue. Materials with these properties include composites such as polyester and epoxy, while glass fiber and carbon fiber have been used for the reinforcing. Construction may involve manual layup or injection molding. Retrofitting existing turbines with larger blades reduces the task and risks of redesign.

Blades need to function over a 100 million load cycles over a period of 20–25 years.

Blade materials 
Materials commonly used in wind turbine blades are described below.

Glass and carbon fibers 

The stiffness of composites is determined by the stiffness of fibers and their volume content. Typically, E-glass fibers are used as main reinforcement in the composites. Typically, the glass/epoxy composites for wind turbine blades contain up to 75% glass by weight. This increases the stiffness, tensile and compression strength. A promising composite material is glass fiber with modified compositions like S-glass, R-glass etc. Other glass fibers developed by Owens Corning are ECRGLAS, Advantex and WindStrand.

Carbon fiber has more tensile strength, higher stiffness and lower density than glass fiber. An ideal candidate for these properties is the spar cap, a structural element of a blade which experiences high tensile loading. However, because carbon fiber is ten times more expensive, glass fiber is still dominant.

Hybrid reinforcements 
Instead of making wind turbine blade reinforcements from pure glass or pure carbon, hybrid designs trade weight for cost. For example, for an  blade, a full replacement by carbon fiber would save 80% of weight but increase costs by 150%, while a 30% replacement would save 50% of weight and increase costs by 90%. Hybrid reinforcement materials include E-glass/carbon, E-glass/aramid. The current longest blade by LM Wind Power is made of carbon/glass hybrid composites. More research is needed about the optimal composition of materials

Nano-engineered polymers and composites 
Additions of small amount (0.5 weight %) of nanoreinforcement (carbon nanotubes or nanoclay) in the polymer matrix of composites, fiber sizing or interlaminar layers can improve fatigue resistance, shear or compressive strength, and fracture toughness of the composites by 30% to 80%. Research has also shown that incorporating small amounts of carbon nanotubes (CNT) can increase the lifetime up to 1500%.

Costs 
, the capital cost of a wind turbine was around $1 million per megawatt of nameplate capacity, though this figure varies by location; for example, such numbers ranged from a half million in South America to $1.7 million in Asia.

For the wind turbine blades, while the material cost is much higher for hybrid glass/carbon fiber blades than all-glass fiber blades, labor costs can be lower. Using carbon fiber allows simpler designs that use less raw material. The chief manufacturing process in blade fabrication is the layering of plies. Thinner blades allow reducing the number of layers and so the labor, and in some cases, equate to the cost of labor for glass fiber blades.

Offshore has significantly higher installation costs.

Non-blade materials 
Wind turbine parts other than the rotor blades (including the rotor hub, gearbox, frame, and tower) are largely made of steel. Smaller turbines (as well as megawatt-scale Enercon turbines) have begun using aluminum alloys for these components to make turbines lighter and more efficient. This trend may grow if fatigue and strength properties can be improved. 
Pre-stressed concrete has been increasingly used for the material of the tower, but still requires much reinforcing steel to meet the strength requirement of the turbine. Additionally, step-up gearboxes are being increasingly replaced with variable speed generators, which requires magnetic materials. In particular, this would require a greater supply of the rare earth metal neodymium.

Modern turbines use a couple of tons of copper for generators, cables and such. , global production of wind turbines use  of copper per year.

Material supply 

A 2015 study of the material consumption trends and requirements for wind energy in Europe found that bigger turbines have a higher consumption of precious metals but lower material input per kW generated. The material consumption and stock at that time was compared to input materials for various onshore system sizes. In all EU countries, the estimates for 2020 doubled the values consumed in 2009. These countries would need to expand their resources to meet the estimated demand for 2020. For example, the EU had 3% of world supply of fluorspar, and it would require 14% by 2020. Globally, the main exporting countries are South Africa, Mexico, and China. This is similar with other critical and valuable materials required for energy systems such as magnesium, silver and indium. The levels of recycling of these materials are very low, and focusing on that could alleviate supply. Because most of these valuable materials are also used in other emerging technologies, like light emitting diodes (LEDs), photo voltaics (PVs) and liquid crystal displays (LCDs), their demand is expected to grow.

A 2011 study by the United States Geological Survey estimated resources required to fulfill the US commitment to supplying 20% of its electricity from wind power by 2030. It did not consider requirements for small turbines or offshore turbines because those were not common in 2008 when the study was done. Common materials such as cast iron, steel and concrete would increase by 2%–3% compared to 2008. Between 110,000 and 115,000 metric tons of fiber glass would be required per year, a 14% increase. Rare-earth metal use would not increase much compared to available supply, however rare-earth metals that are also used for other technologies such as batteries which are increasing its global demand need to be taken into account. Land required would be 50,000 square kilometers onshore and 11,000 offshore. This would not be a problem in the US due to its vast area and because the same land can be used for farming. A greater challenge would be the variability and transmission to areas of high demand.

Permanent magnets for wind turbine generators contain rare-earth metals such as neodymium (Nd), praseodymium (Pr), terbium (Tb), and dysprosium (Dy). Systems that use magnetic direct drive turbines require greater amounts of rare-earth metals. Therefore, an increase in wind turbine manufacture would increase the demand for these resources. By 2035, the demand for Nd is estimated to increase by 4,000 to 18,000 tons and for Dy by 200 to 1200 tons. These values are a quarter to half of current production. However, these estimates are very uncertain because technologies are developing rapidly.

Reliance on rare earth minerals for components has risked expense and price volatility as China has been main producer of rare earth minerals (96% in 2009) and was reducing its export quotas. However, in recent years other producers have increased production and China has increased export quotas, leading to a higher supply and lower cost, and a greater viability of large scale use of variable-speed generators.

Glass fiber is the most common material for reinforcement. Its demand has grown due to growth in construction, transportation and wind turbines. Its global market might reach US$17.4 billion by 2024, compared to US$8.5 billion in 2014. In 2014, Asia Pacific produced more than 45% of the market; now China is the largest producer. The industry receives subsidies from the Chinese government allowing it to export cheaper to the US and Europe. However, price wars have led to anti-dumping measures such as tariffs on Chinese glass fiber.

Wind turbines on public display 

A few localities have exploited the attention-getting nature of wind turbines by placing them on public display, either with visitor centers around their bases, or with viewing areas farther away. The wind turbines are generally of conventional horizontal-axis, three-bladed design, and generate power to feed electrical grids, but they also serve the unconventional roles of technology demonstration, public relations, and education.

Small wind turbines 

Small wind turbines may be used for a variety of applications including on- or off-grid residences, telecom towers, offshore platforms, rural schools and clinics, remote monitoring and other purposes that require energy where there is no electric grid, or where the grid is unstable. Small wind turbines may be as small as a fifty-watt generator for boat or caravan use. Hybrid solar and wind powered units are increasingly being used for traffic signage, particularly in rural locations, as they avoid the need to lay long cables from the nearest mains connection point. The U.S. Department of Energy's National Renewable Energy Laboratory (NREL) defines small wind turbines as those smaller than or equal to 100 kilowatts. Small units often have direct drive generators, direct current output, aeroelastic blades, lifetime bearings and use a vane to point into the wind.

Larger, more costly turbines generally have geared power trains, alternating current output, and flaps, and are actively pointed into the wind. Direct drive generators and aeroelastic blades for large wind turbines are being researched.

Wind turbine spacing 
On most horizontal wind turbine farms, a spacing of about 6–10 times the rotor diameter is often upheld. However, for large wind farms distances of about 15 rotor diameters should be more economical, taking into account typical wind turbine and land costs. This conclusion has been reached by research conducted by Charles Meneveau of Johns Hopkins University and Johan Meyers of Leuven University in Belgium, based on computer simulations that take into account the detailed interactions among wind turbines (wakes) as well as with the entire turbulent atmospheric boundary layer.

Recent research by John Dabiri of Caltech suggests that vertical wind turbines may be placed much more closely together so long as an alternating pattern of rotation is created allowing blades of neighbouring turbines to move in the same direction as they approach one another.

Operability

Maintenance 

Wind turbines need regular maintenance to stay reliable and available. In the best case turbines are available to generate energy 98% of the time. Ice accretion on turbine blades has also been found to greatly reduce the efficiency of wind turbines, which is a common challenge in cold climates where in-cloud icing and freezing rain events occur. De-icing is mainly performed by internal heating, or in some cases by helicopters spraying clean warm water on the blades.

Modern turbines usually have a small onboard crane for hoisting maintenance tools and minor components. However, large, heavy components like generator, gearbox, blades, and so on are rarely replaced, and a heavy lift external crane is needed in those cases. If the turbine has a difficult access road, a containerized crane can be lifted up by the internal crane to provide heavier lifting.

Repowering 

Installation of new wind turbines can be controversial. An alternative is repowering, where existing wind turbines are replaced with bigger, more powerful ones, sometimes in smaller numbers while keeping or increasing capacity.

Demolition and recycling 

Some wind turbines which are out of use are recycled or repowered. 85% of turbine materials are easily reused or recycled, but the blades, made of a composite material, are more difficult to process.

Interest in recycling blades varies in different markets and depends on the waste legislation and local economics. A challenge in recycling blades is related to the composite material, which is made of fiberglass with carbon fibers in epoxy resin, which cannot be remolded to form new composites. So the options are to send the blade to landfill, to reuse the blade and the composite material elements found in the blade, or to transform the composite material into a new source of material.

Wind farm waste is less toxic than other garbage. Wind turbine blades represent only a fraction of overall waste in the US, according to the Wind-industry trade association, American Wind Energy Association. In the US the town of Casper, Wyoming has buried 1,000 non-recyclable blades in its landfill site, earning $675,000 for the town.

Several utilities, start-up companies, and researchers are developing methods for reusing or recycling blades. Manufacturer Vestas has developed technology that can separate the fibers from the resin, allowing for reuse. In Germany, wind turbine blades are commercially recycled as part of an alternative fuel mix for a cement factory. In the United Kingdom, a project will trial cutting blades into strips for use as rebar in concrete, with the aim of reducing emissions in the construction of High Speed 2. Used wind turbine blades have been recycled by incorporating them as part of the support structures within pedestrian bridges in Poland and Ireland.

Comparison with fossil-fuel turbines

Advantages 

Wind turbines produce electricity at between two and six cents per kilowatt hour, which is one of the lowest-priced renewable energy sources. As technology needed for wind turbines continued to improve, the prices decreased as well. In addition, there is currently no competitive market for wind energy, because wind is a freely available natural resource, most of which is untapped. The main cost of small wind turbines is the purchase and installation process, which averages between $48,000 and $65,000 per installation. The energy harvested from the turbine will offset the installation cost, as well as provide virtually free energy for years.

Wind turbines provide a clean energy source, use little water, emitting no greenhouse gases and no waste products during operation. Over  of carbon dioxide per year can be eliminated by using a one-megawatt turbine instead of one megawatt of energy from a fossil fuel.

Disadvantages 

Environmental impact of wind power includes effect on wildlife, but can be mitigated if proper monitoring and mitigation strategies are implemented. Thousands of birds, including rare species, have been killed by the blades of wind turbines, though wind turbines contribute relatively insignificantly to anthropogenic avian mortality. Wind farms and nuclear power plants are responsible for between 0.3 and 0.4 bird deaths per gigawatt-hour (GWh) of electricity while fossil fueled power stations are responsible for about 5.2 fatalities per GWh. In 2009, for every bird killed by a wind turbine in the US, nearly 500,000 were killed by cats and another 500,000 by buildings. In comparison, conventional coal fired generators contribute significantly more to bird mortality, by incineration when caught in updrafts of smoke stacks and by poisoning with emissions byproducts (including particulates and heavy metals downwind of flue gases). Further, marine life is affected by water intakes of steam turbine cooling towers (heat exchangers) for nuclear and fossil fuel generators, by coal dust deposits in marine ecosystems (e.g. damaging Australia's Great Barrier Reef) and by water acidification from combustion monoxides.

Energy harnessed by wind turbines is variable, and is not a "dispatchable" source of power; its availability is based on whether the wind is blowing, not whether electricity is needed. Turbines can be placed on ridges or bluffs to maximize the access of wind they have, but this also limits the locations where they can be placed. In this way, wind energy is not a particularly reliable source of energy. However, it can form part of the energy mix, which also includes power from other sources. Notably, the relative available output from wind and solar sources is often inversely proportional (balancing). Technology is also being developed to store excess energy, which can then make up for any deficits in supplies.

Records 

See also List of most powerful wind turbines

 Most powerful, tallest, largest and with highest 24-hour production GE Wind Energy's Haliade-X is the most powerful wind turbine in the world, at 12MW. It also is the tallest, with a hub height of 150 m and a tip height of 260m. It also has the largest rotor of 220 m and largest swept area at 38000 m2 It also holds the record for the highest production in 24 hours, at 312 MWh.
 Largest capacity conventional (non-direct) drive The Vestas V164 has a rated capacity of 8 MW, later upgraded to 9.5 MW. Conventional drive trains consist of a main gearbox and a medium-speed PM generator. Prototype installed in 2014 at the National Test Center Denmark nearby Østerild. Series production began end of 2015.
 Largest vertical-axis Le Nordais wind farm in Cap-Chat, Quebec, has a vertical axis wind turbine (VAWT) named Éole, which is the world's largest at 110 m. It has a nameplate capacity of 3.8 MW.
 Largest 1-bladed turbine The largest single-bladed wind turbine design to be put into complete operation is the MBB Messerschmitt Monopteros M50, with a total power output of no less than 640 kW at full capacity. As far as the number of units is concerned, only three ever have been installed at an actual wind park, of which all went to the Jade Wind Park.
 Largest 2-bladed turbine The biggest 2-bladed turbine is built by Mingyang Wind Power in 2013. It is a SCD6.5MW offshore downwind turbine, designed by aerodyn Energiesysteme GmbH.
 Highest tower Fuhrländer installed a 2.5 MW turbine on a 160m lattice tower in 2003 (see Fuhrländer Wind Turbine Laasow and Nowy Tomyśl Wind Turbines).
 Most rotors Lagerwey has built Four-in-One, a multi rotor wind turbine with one tower and four rotors near Maasvlakte. In April 2016, Vestas installed a 900 kW four rotor test wind turbine at Risø, made from 4 recycled 225 kW V29 turbines.
 Most productive Four turbines at Rønland Offshore Wind Farm in Denmark share the record for the most productive wind turbines, with each having generated 63.2 GWh by June 2010.
The site uses the WindAid 2.5 kW wind generator to supply power to a small rural community of micro entrepreneurs who cater to the tourists who come to the Pastoruri glacier.
 Largest floating wind turbine The world's largest floating wind turbine is any of the five 6 MW turbines in the 30 MW Hywind Scotland offshore wind farm.

See also 

 Airborne wind turbine
 Compact wind acceleration turbine
 Éolienne Bollée
 Floating wind turbine
IEC 61400
 Renewable energy
 Tidal stream generator
 Unconventional wind turbines
 Wind lens
 Windbelt
 Windpump

References

Further reading 
 Tony Burton, David Sharpe, Nick Jenkins, Ervin Bossanyi: Wind Energy Handbook, John Wiley & Sons, 2nd edition (2011), 
  Darrell, Dodge, Early History Through 1875 , TeloNet Web Development, Copyright 1996–2001
 Robert Gasch, Jochen Twele (ed.), Wind power plants. Fundamentals, design, construction and operation, Springer 2012 .
 Erich Hau, Wind turbines: fundamentals, technologies, application, economics, Springer, 2013  (preview on Google Books)
 Siegfried Heier, Grid integration of wind energy conversion systems, John Wiley & Sons, 3rd edition (2014), 
 Peter Jamieson, Innovation in Wind Turbine Design. Wiley & Sons 2011, 
 J. F. Manwell, J. G. McGowan, A. L. Roberts, Wind Energy Explained: Theory, Design and Application, John Wiley & Sons, 2nd edition (2012), 
 David Spera (ed,) Wind Turbine Technology: Fundamental Concepts in Wind Turbine Engineering, Second Edition (2009), ASME Press, 
 Alois Schaffarczyk (ed.), Understanding wind power technology, John Wiley & Sons, (2014), 
 Hermann-Josef Wagner, Jyotirmay Mathur, Introduction to wind energy systems. Basics, technology and operation. Springer (2013), 
 GA Mansoori, N Enayati, LB Agyarko (2016), Energy: Sources, Utilization, Legislation, Sustainability, Illinois as Model State

External links 

 Global Wind Energy Council
World's Largest Wind Turbine
 Harvesting the Wind (45 lectures about wind turbines by professor Magdi Ragheb

Aerodynamics
Bright green environmentalism
Electric power
Electrical generators
Electromechanical engineering
Energy conversion
 
Wind farms